Sceloporus chaneyi, the Peña Nevada agave lizard, Chaney's spiny lizard, or Chaney's bunchgrass lizard, is a species of lizard in the family Phrynosomatidae. It is endemic to Mexico.

References

Sceloporus
Endemic reptiles of Mexico
Reptiles described in 1992
Taxa named by James R. Dixon